Jewel Princess (foaled 1992 in Florida) is an American Thoroughbred Champion racehorse and winner of the 1996 Breeders' Cup Distaff. She was voted the Eclipse Award as the 1996 American Champion Older Female Horse.

Pedigree

References

 Jewel Princess's pedigree and partial racing stats

1992 racehorse births
Racehorses bred in Florida
Racehorses trained in the United States
Eclipse Award winners
Breeders' Cup Distaff winners
Thoroughbred family 23